Françoise Dupuis (born 18 July 1949) is a Belgian politician who was a Minister for the Parti Socialiste. She held the post of President of the Parliament of the Brussels-Capital Region from 2009 to 2014.

She was educated at the Université libre de Bruxelles (Philosophy and Literature) and the University of East Anglia (MA).

She is the ex-wife of Philippe Moureaux.

References

1949 births
Living people
Université libre de Bruxelles alumni
Alumni of the University of East Anglia
Belgian politicians
21st-century Belgian politicians